Oghenekaro Lydia Itene is a Nigerian actress, businesswoman and humanitarian. She founded The Agnes Fikieme Foundation, whose mission is to enhance the standard of living in the community and increase its efficiency through advocacy, mentoring and creating access to basic necessities.

Early life 
Oghenekaro Itene hails from Isoko, Delta state and was born and raised in Benin City, a town in Edo State, Southern Nigeria. She is a graduate of the University of Benin. The youngest of six children, she quickly learned to express herself through performance. Her first encounter with acting was at age eight when she joined the drama club in her primary school.

Career 
Itene's acting debut came in 2013 in Shattered Mirror, a feature film directed by Lancelot Imasuen Oduwa, portraying Reverend Sister. Onyinye announced Itene as one to watch out for. She appeared as Simi in Lincoln's Clan drama series produced by Total Recall/ content Africa, A pan Africa Project. Her original plan was to work on one or two film projects and concentrate on her company Kadia Makeovers as a makeup artist. She stayed away from acting for a little under one year, returning in 2015, when she landed a role in Mnet Africa series Tinsel, as the wedding planner.

She appeared as Sonia in the feature film Glass House by Africa Magic Original Films/Mnet Production released in 2016, followed by the feature film, The Prodigal  in which she played Tessy. In 2016, Itene landed a role in her first big-screen movie Esohe directed by Charles Uwagbai in the role Itohan. Itene completed a US tour where the movie Esohe premiered. Esohe was selected to screen in Nollywood Travel festival in Toronto and was released in cinemas later that year in the United States, United Kingdom, Europe, and Nigeria.

Selected filmography

Selected films 
Shattered Mirror (2014)
Born Again Sisters (2015)
The Prodigal(2015)
Glass House  (2015)
Esohe
Away From Home(2016)
The Quest (2015)
Chase (2019 film)

Television
Tinsel
Lincoln Clan
The Sanctuary

See also
 List of Nigerian actors
 List of Nigerian entrepreneurs

References

External links

Official Instagram

Living people
21st-century Nigerian actresses
Year of birth missing (living people)
Actresses from Delta State
University of Benin (Nigeria) alumni
People from Benin City
Actresses from Lagos
Nigerian humanitarians
Nigerian businesspeople
Nigerian film actresses